David Wong Louie (December 20, 1954 – September 19, 2018) was a Chinese-American novelist and short story writer.

Life and career 
Born in Rockville Centre, New York, Louie graduated from East Meadow High School in 1973, as "one of the few Asian-Americans" in the school. He received an M.F.A. (Master of Fine Arts) in Creative Writing from the University of Iowa in 1981 and a BA from Vassar College in 1977. He taught at Vassar College and the University of California, Los Angeles.

Louie's short story collection, Pangs of Love received the 1991 First Fiction Award from the Los Angeles Times and the John C. Zacharis First Book Award from Ploughshares. It was also named a Notable Book by The New York Times and a Voice Literary Supplement Favorite. The Barbarians are Coming won the Shirley Collier Prize.

In 2001, he was awarded a Lannan Literary Fellowship. He has also had a fellowship with the National Foundation for the Advancement of Arts.

His short story "Displacement" was included in 100 Years of the Best American Short Stories, Houghton Mifflin Harcourt October 6, 2015.

Louie's essay "Eat, Memory," on his experience living with throat cancer, receiving a tracheostomy tube, and using a G-tube for six years, was originally published in Harper's Magazine in August 2017. The essay was included in Best American Essays 2018, edited by Hilton Als. Louie passed away due to throat cancer on September 19, 2018.

Works
 
 
 A Contemporary Asian American Anthology with Marilyn Chin.

Anthologies

See also

List of Asian American writers

Critical studies 
from March 2008:
Caucasian Partners and Generational Conflicts-David Wong Louie's Pangs of Love By: Wen-ching Ho, EurAmerica: A Journal of European and American Studies, 2004 June; 34 (2): 231–64. (In Chinese)
'The Most Outrageous Masquerade': Queering Asian-American Masculinity By: Crystal Parikh, MFS: Modern Fiction Studies, 2002 Winter; 48 (4): 858–98. (journal article)
Toward a More Worldly World Series: Reading Game Three of the 1998 American League Championship and David Wong Louie's 'Warming Trends' By: Jeff Partridge, American Studies International, 2000 June; 38 (2): 115–25. (journal article)

Saddle ; Zyzzyva, 1999 Winter; 15 (3): 116–21.
Chinese/Asian American Men in the 1990s: Displacement, Impersonation, Paternity, and Extinction in David Wong Louie's Pangs of Love By: Sau-ling Cynthia Wong. IN: Okihiro, Alquizola, Rony and Wong, Privileging Positions: The Sites of Asian American Studies. Pullman: Washington State UP; 1995. pp. 181–91
Cynthia Kadohata and David Wong Louie: The Pangs of a Floating World By: Sheila Sarkar; Hitting Critical Mass: A Journal of Asian American Cultural Criticism, 1994 Winter; 2 (1): 79–97.
Affirmations: Speaking the Self into Being By: Manini Samarth; Parnassus: Poetry in Review, 1992; 17 (1): 88–101.

References

External links
 English at UCLA: David Wong Louie (accessed March 2008)

1954 births
2018 deaths
American short story writers
American novelists of Chinese descent
Writers from California
Vassar College alumni
Iowa Writers' Workshop alumni
University of California, Los Angeles faculty
People from Rockville Centre, New York
American short story writers of Chinese descent
American male novelists
American male short story writers
East Meadow High School alumni